The South American zone of 2010 FIFA World Cup qualification saw ten teams competing for places in the finals in South Africa. The format is identical to that used for the previous three World Cup qualification tournaments held by CONMEBOL. Matches were scheduled so that there were always two games within a week, which was aimed at minimizing player travel time, particularly for players who were based in Europe.

The top four teams in the final standings qualified automatically for the 2010 FIFA World Cup. The fifth-placed team met the fourth-placed team from the CONCACAF qualifying tournament in a two-legged play-off for a place at the World Cup.

Standings 

On 24 November 2008, FIFA suspended the Peruvian Football Federation from all international competition due to governmental interference in its operations. The suspension was lifted on 20 December 2008.

Results 
The round-by-round fixtures were same as the 2002 and 2006 qualifying tournament.

Round 1

Round 2

Round 3

Round 4

Round 5

Round 6

Round 7

Round 8

Round 9

Round 10

Round 11

Round 12

Round 13

Round 14

Round 15

Round 16

Round 17

Round 18

Inter-confederation play-offs

The team from fourth place in the CONCACAF qualifying fourth round (Costa Rica) entered into a home and away play-off against the team which finished fifth in the CONMEBOL qualifying group (Uruguay). The winner of this play-off qualified for the 2010 FIFA World Cup finals. The draw for the order in which the two matches were played was held on 2 June 2009 during the FIFA Congress in Nassau, the Bahamas.

Qualified teams
The following five teams from CONMEBOL qualified for the final tournament.

1 Bold indicates champions for that year. Italic indicates hosts for that year.

Goalscorers 
There were 234 goals scored in 92 games, including three own goals, for an average of 2.54 goals per game (Costa Rica's single goal in the inter-confederation play-offs not included).

10 goals
  Humberto Suazo

9 goals
  Luís Fabiano

8 goals
  Joaquín Botero

7 goals

  Marcelo Moreno
  Diego Forlán

6 goals

  Salvador Cabañas
  Sebastián Abreu
  Giancarlo Maldonado

5 goals

  Kaká
  Nilmar
  Nelson Valdez
  Luis Suárez

4 goals

  Sergio Agüero
  Lionel Messi
  Juan Román Riquelme
  Robinho
  Matías Fernández
  Édison Méndez
  Carlos Bueno
  Diego Lugano

3 goals

  Alexis Sánchez
  Jackson Martínez
  Walter Ayoví
  Christian Benítez
  Cristian Riveros
  Roque Santa Cruz
  Johan Fano
  Juan Arango
  Miku
  José Manuel Rey

2 goals

  Ronald García
  Júlio Baptista
  Gonzalo Jara
  Gary Medel
  Fabián Orellana
  Marcelo Salas
  Rubén Darío Bustos
  Hugo Rodallega
  Iván Kaviedes
  Christian Noboa
  Antonio Valencia
  Óscar Cardozo
  Paulo da Silva
  Hernán Rengifo
  Juan Manuel Vargas
  Sebastián Eguren
  Daniel Arismendi
  Ronald Vargas

1 goal

  Mario Bolatti
  Esteban Cambiasso
  Jesús Dátolo
  Daniel Díaz
  Lucho González
  Gonzalo Higuaín
  Gabriel Milito
  Rodrigo Palacio
  Martín Palermo
  Maxi Rodríguez
  Carlos Tevez
  Juan Carlos Arce
  Álex da Rosa
  Edgar Rolando Olivares
  Didi Torrico
  Gerardo Yecerotte
  Adriano
  Dani Alves
  Elano
  Felipe Melo
  Juan
  Luisão
  Ronaldinho
  Vágner Love
  Jean Beausejour
  Marco Estrada
  Ismael Fuentes
  Rodrigo Millar
  Waldo Ponce
  Jorge Valdivia
  Arturo Vidal
  Radamel Falcao
  Teófilo Gutiérrez
  Dayro Moreno
  Giovanni Moreno
  Adrián Ramos
  Wason Rentería
  Macnelly Torres
  Felipe Caicedo
  Isaac Mina
  Jefferson Montero
  Pablo Palacios
  Carlos Tenorio
  Patricio Urrutia
  Néstor Ayala
  Édgar Benítez
  Piero Alva
  Juan Carlos Mariño
  Andrés Mendoza
  Vicente Sánchez
  Andrés Scotti
  Alejandro Guerra
  Alejandro Moreno
  Alexander Rondón

1 own goal

  Gabriel Heinze (against Paraguay)
  Ronald Rivero (against Venezuela)
  Juan Fuenmayor (against Peru)

* FIFA.com: Scorer stats

Notes

This was the first time that Argentina lost more than 2 or 4 matches and has not finished as leader (1st) or runner-up (2nd) of their qualifying group, during a FIFA World Cup qualification.

References

External links
South America Zone at FIFA.com
FIFA and CONMEBOL agree preliminary competition format and venues
FIFA and CONMEBOL caution and ejection statistics

 
CONMEBOL
FIFA World Cup qualification (CONMEBOL)
World
World
World

CONMEBOL)